The VAXstation is a discontinued family of workstation computers developed and manufactured by Digital Equipment Corporation using processors implementing the VAX instruction set architecture. VAXstation systems were typically shipped with either the OpenVMS or ULTRIX operating systems. Many members of the VAXstation family had corresponding MicroVAX variants, which primarily differ by the lack of graphics hardware.

VAXstation 100 
The VAXstation 100 was a VAXstation-branded graphics terminal introduced in May 1983. It used a Motorola 68000 microprocessor and connected to its VAX host via Unibus. It was used for developing the X Window System.

VAXstation 500 
The VAXstation 500 was a VAXstation-branded successor to the VAXstation 100 with color graphics, introduced in October 1985. It consisted of a MicroVAX I and a Tektronix 4125 colour terminal.

VAXstation I 
Introduced in October 1984, it was code named "Seahorse", and used the KD32 CPU module containing a 4 MHz (250 ns) MicroVAX I processor.

VAXstation II 
Code named "Mayflower", it used the KA630 CPU module containing a 5 MHz (200 ns) MicroVAX 78032 microprocessor. It was essentially a MicroVAX II in a workstation configuration.

VAXstation II/RC 

A short-lived, lower-cost "Reduced Configuration" variant of the VAXstation II. Compared with the standard VAXstation II, a number of the slots on the backplane were filled with epoxy to limit the system's upgradability. It was discontinued when Digital discovered that enterprising customers were removing the epoxy, or replacing the backplane in order to convert the RC into a standard VAXstation II.

VAXstation II/GPX 
Introduced in December 1985, it was code named "Caylith", and was a variant of the VAXstation II with hardware-enhanced, high-performance color graphics.

VAXstation 2000 
Introduced in February 1987, it was code named "VAXstar" or "Kapri", and used the KA410 CPU module containing a 5 MHz MicroVAX II processor with no cache. It was essentially a MicroVAX 2000 in a workstation configuration.

VAXstation 3100 Series

VAXstation 3100 Model 30 (VS42A-xx) 
Code named "PVAX", it used the KA42-A CPU module containing an 11.12 MHz (90 ns) CVAX microprocessor with a 64 KB external cache.

The VT1300 X terminal was essentially a diskless VAXstation 3100 Model 30, running the VAXELN operating system.

VAXstation 3100 Model 38 (WS42A-xx) 
Code named "PVAX rev#7", it used the KA42-B CPU module containing a 16.67 MHz (60 ns) CVAX+ microprocessor with a 64KB external cache.

VAXstation 3100 Model 40 (VS42S-xx) 
Code named "PVAX", it used the KA42-A CPU module containing an 11.12 MHz (90 ns) CVAX microprocessor with a 64KB external cache. It used the same CPU module and system board as the Model 30, but was housed in a larger case which could hold additional 5.25" and 3.5" drives.

VAXstation 3100 Model 48 (WS42B-xx) 
Code named "PVAX rev#7", it used the KA42-B CPU module containing a 16.67 MHz (60 ns) CVAX+ microprocessor with a 64KB external cache.

VAXstation 3100 Model 76 
Code named "RigelMAX", it used the KA43-A CPU module containing a 35.71 MHz (28 ns) Rigel microprocessor with a 128 KB external cache. It provided two separate SCSI buses, one for internal devices and one for external.

VXT 2000 
The VXT 2000 was an X terminal using the SOC microprocessor.  This system was essentially a VAXstation 3100 Model 30 without any mass storage and set up to network boot a VAXeln image that allowed it to be an X-Windows terminal.

VAXstation 3200 and VAXstation 3500 
Code named "Mayfair/GPX", it used the KA650 CPU module containing a CVAX chip set operating at 11.12 MHz (90 ns cycle time) with 64 KB of external secondary cache. They differed by the enclosure used, the 3200 using a BA23, whereas the 3500 used the BA213. As such, they were effectively workstation configurations of the MicroVAX III and MicroVAX 3500 respectively.

VAXstation 3520 and VAXstation 3540 
The VAXstation 3520 and VAXstation 3540, code named "Firefox", were multiprocessor computers with two or four CVAX chip sets respectively, contained on KA60 CPU modules running at 12.5 MHz (80 ns cycle time). They were based the experimental DEC Firefly multiprocessor workstation, and were positioned as mid-range workstations. The first official announcement from Digital regarding these workstations was on 10 January 1989, although it was a "programme announcement" with no dates or prices provided.

VAXstation 4000 Series

VAXstation 4000 Model VLC 

The VAXstation 4000 VLC (Very Low Cost), aka VAXstation 4000 M30, was an entry-level workstation introduced on 30 October 1991. It was code named "PVAX2/VLC". It used the KA48 CPU module containing a 25 MHz (40 ns cycle time) SOC microprocessor. It had 8 to 24 MB of memory, using the MS40-BA SIMM, which was a low-height standard 72-pin 80 ns memory module with parity.

VAXstation 4000 Model 60 
The VAXstation 4000 Model 60, code named "PMariah", was announced on 30 October 1991 and became available on 25 November 1991. It used the KA46 CPU module containing a Mariah chip set operating at 55 MHz (18 ns cycle time) with 256 KB of external cache. It supported 8 to 104 MB of memory, with SIMMs installed in pairs. SIMMs used were the 4 MB MS44L-AA and the 16 MB MS44-DA, which both had parity. It was the first VAX system to use the TURBOchannel interconnect. The upgrade path was to the VAXstation 4000 Model 96.

VAXstation 4000 Model 90 
The VAXstation 4000 Model 90, code named "Cougar", was a further development of the VAXstation 4000 Model 60. Development of the VAXstation 4000 Model 90 began in mid-1991.

The workstation used the KA49-A CPU module containing a NVAX microprocessor operating at 74.43 MHz (14 ns cycle time) with a 256 KB external secondary cache. The NVAX had a 64-bit data bus to the NMC (NVAX Memory Controller) two gate array. The system module contained eight SIMM slots, and the workstation supported 16 to 128 MB of memory with parity. 16 MB MS44L-BC and 64 MB MS44-DC memory kits were used to populate the SIMM slots. Each memory kit contained four SIMMs with capacities of 4 MB and 16 MB respectively.

The VAXstation 4000 Model 90 supported 3D graphics hardware, the SPXg and SPXgt options. These modules had their own connector on the system module.

I/O was based around the NCA, a gate array which implemented an input/output adapter. The I/O subsystem had two independent 32-bit buses that communicated with the I/O and graphics options available. One of the buses interfaced to a TURBOchannel slot, the firmware contained within ROMs and the graphics options. The other bus interfaced to the Ethernet and EDAL controllers. EDAL was a 16-bit general-purpose bus for I/O. The EDAL controller consisted of a CEAC (CDAL-to-EDAL Chip) and a SQWF chip.

Ethernet was provided by the SGEC (Second-Generation Ethernet Controller) chip. SCSI was provided by the NCR 53C94, which connected to the EDAL bus. Serial lines were provided by a DC7085 quad UART. The four serial lines were used for the keyboard, mouse, modem and printer/console. A 64-entry FIFO queue was provided for all four serial lines and was implemented by a small external SRAM. Voice-quality sound was provided by an AMD Am79C30.

The VAXstation 4000 Model 90 could be upgraded to a VAXstation 4000 Model 96.

VAXstation 4000 Model 90A 
The VAXstation 4000 Model 90A, code named "Cougar+", was a faster version of the Model 90. It used the KA49-A CPU module containing a NVAX microprocessor operating at 83 MHz (12 ns cycle time) but was otherwise the same. The upgrade path was to the VAXstation 4000 Model 96.

VAXstation 4000 Model 96 
The VAXstation 4000 Model 96, code named "Cougar++", was a faster version of the Model 90A. It was discontinued on 30 September 1999, with the last shipments concluding on 31 December 1999.

It used the KA49-C CPU module containing a NVAX microprocessor operating at 100 MHz (10 ns cycle time) but was otherwise the same.

VAXstation 8000 
The VAXstation 8000, code named "Lynx", was a high-end workstation introduced on 2 February 1988. It was essentially a VAX 8250 packaged in a deskside enclosure with a 3D graphics pipeline developed jointly with Evans & Sutherland. It was the only VAXstation to use a Full VAX processor instead of a MicroVAX as its main CPU.

Software 
DTP software for VMS on the VAXstation included Interleaf IWPS/IWPS-Plus, CGS Digi-Design/ORIS, DECwrite  and WordPerfect.

Mechanical CAE software:
Applicon Bravo (in 1988; with 3D-views),
SDRC applications (incl. FEM pre- and postprocessing, I-DEAS),
Prime GNC (GNC i.e. Graphical Numerical Control; a Numerical control application), MCS (Manufacturing & Consulting Services) ANVIL-5000, ISYKON (bought by Intergraph) Proren, EUCLID-IS, Unigraphics, MEDUSA

References

Further reading 
 Michael A. Callander, Sr. et al., "The VAXstation 4000 Model 90". Digital Technical Journal, Volume 4, Number 3, Summer 1992. Digital Equipment Corporation.

DEC workstations
Computer-related introductions in 1984
32-bit computers